Omnivore Recordings is an independent record label founded in 2010. It specializes in historical releases, reissues and previously unissued vintage recordings, as well as select releases of new music, on CD, vinyl and digital formats. Omnivore Recordings is a part of Omnivore Entertainment Group LLC, which also incorporates sister companies Omnivore Music Publishing and Omnivore Creative, which provides A&R and art direction/design consulting for recording artists, artist estates, and other record labels.

Omnivore's name reflects the company's inclusive attitude towards the music it releases, encompassing a wide variety of genres, spanning the history of popular music, and reflecting the broad musical interests of the company's staff.

History 
In its first decade of operation, Omnivore released approximately 400 albums, including archival music by a broad assortment of notable acts, including Arthur Alexander, America, the Bangles, the Beach Boys, Big Star, the Blind Boys of Alabama, Tim Buckley, Sandy Bull, Camper Van Beethoven, Alex Chilton, Gene Clark, Dennis Coffey, Continental Drifters, Culture, Bobby Darin, Dion, Dr. John, The Dream Syndicate, David "Honeyboy" Edwards, Fastball, Maynard Ferguson, Neil Finn, Game Theory, Allen Ginsberg, Andrew Gold, Vince Guaraldi, Arlo Guthrie, Woody Guthrie, Merle Haggard, John Wesley Harding, Judy Henske, Peter Holsapple and Chris Stamey, Wanda Jackson, Jan and Dean, Bert Jansch, Jellyfish, George Jones, Paul Kelly, The Knack, Lone Justice, Malo, Iain Matthews, Les McCann, Kate and Anna McGarrigle, The Motels, Bob Mould, Harry Nilsson, NRBQ, Old 97s, Buck Owens, Van Dyke Parks, Jaco Pastorius, Art Pepper, The Posies, Alan Price, Raspberries, Bobby Rush, Leon Russell, Soul Asylum, The Staple Singers, John Stewart, 10,000 Maniacs, Richard Thompson, Townes Van Zandt, Hank Williams and Brian Wilson, as well as vintage comedy recordings by Ernie Kovacs and Edie Adams. The label has also issued new music by Cindy Lee Berryhill, The Bo-Keys, Cait Brennan, Peter Case, Lloyd Cole, Jeffrey Gaines, Luke Haines and Peter Buck, The Long Ryders, The Muffs, Chris Price, Pugwash and Steve Wynn.

Omnivore was launched in 2010 by a quartet of music industry veterans: 
Cheryl Pawelski, a Grammy-winning producer of archival and reissue albums. During her stints with EMI-Capitol Records, Rhino Entertainment and Concord Music Group, she oversaw acclaimed reissue and boxed set projects by such acts as The Band, The Beach Boys, Big Star, John Coltrane, Miles Davis, Aretha Franklin, Judy Henske, Bette Midler, Willie Nelson, Otis Redding, Nina Simone, Rod Stewart, Richard Thompson, Wilco and Warren Zevon, as well as the Grammy-nominated boxed sets  Rockin' Bones: 1950s Punk & Rockabilly, Woodstock 40 Years On: Back To Yasgur's Farm and  Where the Action Is! Los Angeles Nuggets: 1965–1968.
Greg Allen, a veteran graphic designer and photographer, who has served as art director on numerous releases for various major labels, including boxed sets by Ray Charles, John Coltrane, Alice Cooper, Miles Davis, Little Richard, Gram Parsons and Wilco.
Dutch Cramblitt, who had previously worked as VP of Sales for Rhino Entertainment and Nettwerk Entertainment, as well as holding various sales roles at WEA Distribution, Hollywood Records, EMI, SBK and Capitol.
Brad Rosenberger, who previously worked as assistant to producer Richard Perry, film/TV manager for Jobete Music/Motown Records and Head of Strategic Marketing/Catalog Development for Warner Chappell Music.

Working with the founders/owners, Grammy-nominated industry veteran Lee Lodyga (formerly of EMI-Capitol, Universal and Rhino) and industry veteran Glenn Schwartz (formerly of Sony Music, Zomba Recording Corporation and Rhino Entertainment) handle additional record production and licensing functions for Omnivore.

Omnivore's initial releases were a pair of limited-edition vinyl issues for Record Store Day on April 16, 2011: the Big Star album Third [Test Pressing Edition], and the 7″ single "Close Up the Honky Tonks" by Buck Owens. Since then, the label has maintained a steady stream of releases.

The label releases recordings in a wide variety of formats, including but not limited to CD, digital, vinyl, flexi discs, cylinders and more. Some are limited editions; however, most are widely available through regular retail outlets worldwide. Billboard noted the "great historical significance" of Omnivore's limited-edition release in April 2012 of a rare recording of Buck Owens performing at the White House for President Lyndon Johnson in 1968, newly pressed by Omnivore on flexi discs in red, white, or blue, each copy packaged with an original uncirculated coloring book that had been commissioned by Owens in 1970 and preserved unreleased for over 40 years.

Omnivore also acquires vintage master recordings and publishing catalogues from defunct companies. These include the Nighthawk Records and Ru-Jac Records labels, and the Blackheart Music Publishing catalog.

Omnivore's releases are distributed by The Orchard/Sony Music.

Restoration
Omnivore has employed a variety of engineers in its restoration of vintage recordings, with three-time Grammy winner Michael Graves of Los Angeles’ Osiris Studio serving as the company’s primary restoration and mastering engineer, and Jeff Powell at Take Out Vinyl in Memphis mastering most of the company’s vinyl releases. Other notable engineers who have worked on mastering and restoration for Omnivore projects include Ron McMaster of Capitol Mastering, Bob Ludwig of Gateway Mastering, Gavin Lurssen and Reuben Cohen of Lurssen Mastering, Justin Perkins of Mystery Room Mastering, Kevin Gray of Cohearent, Larry Nix of Larry Nix Mastering and Michael Romanowski of Coast Mastering.

Awards
Omnivore's first Grammy-winning release was Hank Williams' The Garden Spot Programs, 1950, which won a 2014 Grammy Award for Best Historical Album. The award recognized producers Colin Escott and Cheryl Pawelski, and audio engineer Michael Graves. Other award-winning Omnivore releases include Bobby Rush's Chicken Heads: A 50-Year History Of Bobby Rush (2017 Blues Foundation Awards, Best Historical or Vintage Recording; 2017 Living Blues Awards, Best Historical Post-War  Album), The Motels' Apocalypso (2012 Independent Music Awards, Best Reissue) and Jeffrey Gaines' Alright (2018 PureM Music Awards USA, Best New Album).

Select discography

References

External links 
Omnivore Recordings website
Henry Rollins interviews Cheryl Pawelski (2020)

American independent record labels
Reissue record labels
Companies based in Los Angeles
Record labels established in 2010
Recording studios owned by women